Wang Qi (born February 1943) is a Chinese andrologist who is a professor and doctoral supervisor at Beijing University of Chinese Medicine.

Biography
Wang was born in Gaoyou, Jiangsu, in February 1943.

Honours and awards
 1997 National Famous and Old Expert in Traditional Chinese Medicine
 1998 National Medical Master
 2013 Science and Technology Progress Award of the Ho Leung Ho Lee Foundation 
 2014 Honorary Professor of Hong Kong Baptist University
 2014 Honorary Professor of Macao University of Science and Technology
 November 22, 2019 Member of the Chinese Academy of Engineering (CAE)

References

1943 births
Living people
People from Gaoyou
Chinese andrologists
Physicians from Jiangsu
20th-century Chinese physicians
21st-century Chinese physicians
Academic staff of Beijing University of Chinese Medicine
Members of the Chinese Academy of Engineering